In physics and quantum chemistry, specifically density functional theory, the Kohn–Sham equation is the non-interacting Schrödinger equation (more clearly, Schrödinger-like equation) of a fictitious system (the "Kohn–Sham system") of non-interacting particles (typically electrons) that generate the same density as any given system of interacting particles. The Kohn–Sham equation is defined by a local effective (fictitious) external potential in which the non-interacting particles move, typically denoted as vs(r) or veff(r), called the Kohn–Sham potential. If the particles in the Kohn–Sham system are non-interacting fermions (non-fermion Density Functional Theory has been researched), the Kohn–Sham wavefunction is a single Slater determinant constructed from a set of orbitals that are the lowest-energy solutions to

 

This eigenvalue equation is the typical representation of the Kohn–Sham equations. Here εi is the orbital energy of the corresponding Kohn–Sham orbital , and the density for an N-particle system is

 

The Kohn–Sham equations are named after Walter Kohn and Lu Jeu Sham, who introduced the concept at the University of California, San Diego, in 1965.

Kohn–Sham potential

In Kohn–Sham density functional theory, the total energy of a system is expressed as a functional of the charge density as

 

where Ts is the Kohn–Sham kinetic energy, which is expressed in terms of the Kohn–Sham orbitals as

 

vext is the external potential acting on the interacting system (at minimum, for a molecular system, the electron–nuclei interaction), EH is the Hartree (or Coulomb) energy

 

and Exc is the exchange–correlation energy. The Kohn–Sham equations are found by varying the total energy expression with respect to a set of orbitals, subject to constraints on those orbitals, to yield the Kohn–Sham potential as

 

where the last term

 

is the exchange–correlation potential. This term, and the corresponding energy expression, are the only unknowns in the Kohn–Sham approach to density functional theory. An approximation that does not vary the orbitals is Harris functional theory.

The Kohn–Sham orbital energies εi, in general, have little physical meaning (see Koopmans' theorem). The sum of the orbital energies is related to the total energy as

 

Because the orbital energies are non-unique in the more general restricted open-shell case, this equation only holds true for specific choices of orbital energies (see Koopmans' theorem).

References 

Density functional theory